The Basset Artésien Normand (Norman Artesian Basset) is a short legged hound type dog developed in France. The word basset refers to short-legged hounds.

History
The Basset Artésien Normand and the more familiar Basset Hound share a common ancestry in the short-legged hounds of northern France of the early 19th century that displayed osteochondrodysplasia dwarfism. But unlike the Basset Hound, which was developed by English breeders in the late 19th century as a more substantial dog that was initially cross-bred with Bloodhounds, the Basset-type dogs that French breeders developed remained lighter-boned and more focused on hunting ability.

Documenting of these French Bassets as a purebred breed began in 1870, and from a common ancestral type, two strains were developed. One had straight front legs (Basset d'Artois) and the other had crooked front legs (Normand). The breed club was formed in 1910 and the breed was given its present name in 1924.

Bassets are walking hounds, which are followed by the hunter on foot. The short legs mean that they would not get too far away from the hunter. The Basset Artésien Normand was used to hunt rabbits and other small game alone or in packs, but today they are primarily bred to be pets.

Appearance
The coat is short and tricolored (fawn and white with black blanket, a patch across the back) or bicolored (fawn and white). The head and long ears are distinctive, and the temperament should be calm and good-natured.

Recognition
The original breed club is the Club français du Basset Artésien Normand & du Chien d'Artois, and the breed is recognised by the Fédération Cynologique Internationale (FCI) as breed number 34 in Group 6, Scenthounds. The Basset Artésien Normand is one of six types of "basset"-type breeds recognised by the FCI. It is also recognised by the United Kennel Club (US) in the Scenthound Group. The breed may also be recognised by any of the various minor kennel clubs and internet based dog registry businesses, as well as hunting dog registries and clubs. As the breed is few in number outside France it is also promoted by rare breed breeder organisations for puppy buyers seeking an unusual pet.

See also
 Dogs portal
 List of dog breeds
 Basset Hound
 Basset Bleu de Gascogne
 Basset Fauve de Bretagne
 Petit Basset Griffon Vendéen 
 Grand Basset Griffon Vendéen

References

FCI breeds
Scent hounds
Dog breeds originating in France